The 2022–23 season was the 32nd season in the history of Balatonfüredi KSE and their 16th consecutive season in the top flight. The club will participate in Nemzeti Bajnokság I, the Magyar Kupa and the EHF European League.

Club

Management
{| class="wikitable"
|-
! style="color:black; background:yellow"|Position !! style="color:black; background:yellow"|Staff member
|-
| President || János Eppel
|-
| Executive director || Tamás Bene
|-
| Sports director || Ákos Kis
|}

UniformSupplier: 2RuleShirt sponsor (front): tippmix / 77 Elektronika / Takarékbank / City of Balatonfüred / VolkswagenShirt sponsor (back): ZÁÉVShorts sponsor:' Sennebogen 

Competitions
Times up to 30 October 2022 and from 26 March 2023 are CEST (UTC+2). Times from 30 October 2022 to 26 March 2023 are CET (UTC+1).

Overview

Nemzeti Bajnokság I

Regular season

Results by round

Matches
The league fixtures were announced on 5 July 2022.FÉRFI KÉZILABDA NB I, 2022–2023

Results overview

Magyar Kupa

Balatonfüred entered the tournament in the fourth round.

EHF European League

The draw was held on 6 October 2022 in Vienna, Austria.

Results overview

Statistics

Top scorers
Includes all competitive matches. The list is sorted by shirt number when total goals are equal. Last updated on 19 September 2022.''

References

External links
 

 
Balatonfüredi KSE